Hassi Mamèche is a district in Mostaganem Province, Algeria. It was named after its capital, Hassi Mamèche.

Municipalities
The district is further divided into 3 municipalities:
Hassi Mamèche
Stidia 
Mazagran

Districts of Mostaganem Province